Mihai Ţurcaş (born 18 November 1942 - d. 22 December 2002) was a Romanian sprint canoeist. Competing in the four-man 1000 m event (K-4 1000 m) he won the world title in 1966, the European title in 1967, and two Olympic medals in 1964 and 1968. After retiring from competition he worked as a kayaking coach and was involved with the national junior and senior teams between 1990 and 1992.

References

External links

1942 births
Canoeists at the 1964 Summer Olympics
Canoeists at the 1968 Summer Olympics
2002 deaths
Olympic canoeists of Romania
Olympic silver medalists for Romania
Olympic bronze medalists for Romania
Romanian male canoeists
Olympic medalists in canoeing
ICF Canoe Sprint World Championships medalists in kayak

Medalists at the 1968 Summer Olympics
Medalists at the 1964 Summer Olympics